NGC 1783 (also known as ESO 85-SC29) is a globular cluster within the Dorado constellation and part of the Large Magellanic Cloud, a satellite dwarf galaxy of the Milky Way. At an aperture of 50 arcseconds, its apparent V-band magnitude is 10.39, making it one of the brightest globular clusters in the LMC as viewed from Earth. It was discovered in 1835 by John Herschel. The compiler of the New General Catalogue, John Louis Emil Dreyer, described this cluster as "considerably bright, large, round, very gradually pretty much brighter middle, mottled but not resolved."

NGC 1783 is about 1.7 billion years old. All else equal, older star clusters have higher mass-to-luminosity ratios; that is, they have lower luminosities for the same mass.

References

External links
 

Globular clusters
1783
ESO objects
Dorado (constellation)
Astronomical objects discovered in 1835
Large Magellanic Cloud